Arthur Frederick Wheeler (5 August 1916 – 16 June 2001) was an English professional  Grand Prix motorcycle road racer. Wheeler gained a reputation as one of the top privateer racers on the Grand Prix circuit.


Early life
Born in Epsom, Surrey, Wheeler left school at the age of 15 to be an apprentice electrician and engineer. He began his competitive motorcycling career campaigning a Velocette in grass track racing. Opening a motorcycle shop in 1937, he used his profits to enable his motorcycle racing career. When World War II started, Wheeler's engineering skills led him to being chosen to work alongside Barnes Wallis in developing the bouncing bomb.

Motorcycle racing career
After the war, his motorcycle business boomed, allowing him to enter Grands Prix racing on the circuits of Continental Europe. Wheeler won the 1954 250 cc Nations Grand Prix at Monza after the dominant NSU factory racing team withdrew from the race. He was a five-time winner of the North West 200 race in Northern Ireland and won the Leinster 200 at least twice. His best season was aboard a Moto Guzzi in 1962, when he won the 250 cc Argentine Grand Prix and had a fourth-place finish in the Isle of Man Lightweight TT, finishing in third place in the 250 cc world championship behind Jim Redman and Bob McIntyre. At the end of that year he retired at the age of 46. His victory in Argentina made him the oldest rider to have won a Grand Prix motorcycle race in any class, a record that stands to this day.

Wheeler continued to develop the long-outdated Moto Guzzi (which ceased production around 1953) all through his career, using home built streamlined 'dustbin' and 'dolphin' fairings and along with Ken Sprayson at Reynolds tubing (Reynolds Tubes Co Ltd) he developed a spine frame with swinging arm rear suspension and oil bearing top tube. Wheeler was a close friend with many of the Guzzi factory riders, and it was through Fergus Anderson that he acquired his first Guzzi from the factory, a pre-war Albatross 250 cc, which was to be developed through the 1950s to Gambalunghino spec and beyond. After his win at the Nations Grand Prix it was Moto Guzzi factory rider Enrico Lorenzetti who gave Wheeler his stock of factory spare parts, enabling him to campaign the Guzzis long after the official factory team had disbanded.

Motorcycle Grand Prix results 
Points system from 1950 to 1968:

(key) (Races in italics indicate fastest lap)

Notes

References

1916 births
2001 deaths
Sportspeople from Epsom
British motorcycle racers
English motorcycle racers
125cc World Championship riders
250cc World Championship riders
350cc World Championship riders
500cc World Championship riders
Isle of Man TT riders